The Blanco River is a river of Naguabo, Puerto Rico. It runs from north to southeast.

See also
List of rivers of Puerto Rico

References

External links
 USGS Hydrologic Unit Map – Caribbean Region (1974)

Rivers of Puerto Rico